= Singhan =

Singhan was a king of the Yadava kingdom in approximately the 13th century, located in what today is the Maharashtra State of India.
